The Estonian Mixed Doubles Curling Championship is the national championship of mixed doubles curling (one man and one woman) in Estonia. It has been held annually since the 2007–2008 season, and is organized by the Estonian Curling Association.

List of champions and medallists
Team line-ups shows in order: woman, man, coach (if exists).

Medal record for curlers

See also
Estonian Men's Curling Championship
Estonian Women's Curling Championship
Estonian Mixed Curling Championship

References

Curling competitions in Estonia
Recurring sporting events established in 2008
2008 establishments in Estonia
National curling championships
Mixed doubles curling
National championships in Estonia